Mike Sanders is an American politician who served as a member of the Oklahoma House of Representatives from the 59th district from 2008 to 2020.

Early life and career
Mike Sanders was born in Kingfisher, Oklahoma on June 27, 1975. He received a B.A. in history from Oklahoma Christian University in 1997 and later attended Georgetown University for graduate school. He worked as the Director of Interns in George W. Bush's Whitehouse in 2000, and later successfully ran for the Oklahoma House of Representatives in 2008 where he served until term limited in 2020.

References

1975 births
Living people
Republican Party members of the Oklahoma House of Representatives
21st-century American politicians
Oklahoma Christian University alumni